The Beatles in Mono is a boxed set compilation comprising the remastered monaural recordings by the Beatles. The set was released on compact disc on 9 September 2009, the same day the remastered stereo recordings and companion The Beatles (The Original Studio Recordings) were also released, along with The Beatles: Rock Band video game. The remastering project for both mono and stereo versions was led by EMI senior studio engineers Allan Rouse and Guy Massey.  The release date of 09/09/09 is related to the significance to John Lennon of the number nine.

The boxed set was released on 180-gram heavyweight vinyl on 8 September 2014, mastered directly from the original analogue tapes and not the digital masters used for the CD release.

Intention
The Beatles in Mono was released to reflect the fact that most of the Beatles' catalogue was originally mixed and released in the monophonic format. Stereo recordings were a fairly new concept for pop music in the 1960s and did not become standard until late in that decade. This explains why the Beatles' initial album releases were mixed for mono. By the late sixties, however, stereo recording for pop music was becoming more popular and, thus, the new standard. Therefore, the last few Beatles albums—Yellow Submarine, Abbey Road and Let It Be—were mixed and released only in stereo. Many feel that the mono mixes reflect the true intention of the band. For example, in the case of Sgt. Pepper's Lonely Hearts Club Band, all the mono mixes were done together with the Beatles themselves, throughout the recording of the album, whereas the stereo mixes were done in only six days by Abbey Road personnel George Martin, Geoff Emerick and Richard Lush after the album had been finished, with none of the Beatles attending. George Harrison commented:

John Lennon did not like the stereo mix of his song "Revolution" on the 1967-1970 compilation album. Lennon stated during a 1974 interview:

Limited edition
Amazon.com advertised the set as a limited edition item in the United States. Less than a month prior to the set's release it was announced that the site had sold out of units. Less than two weeks before 9 September, many other online retailers announced the selling out of units from their inventories, including the Canadian Amazon.ca site.

EMI announced on 3 September that more mono boxed sets were to be pressed due to high demand from online pre-orders. It is still to remain a "limited edition", but since it has already been certified platinum by the RIAA it was not limited to 10,000 copies as originally stated. As of July 2018, the CD set is still readily available; however, the vinyl box set is out of print. Individual mono albums on vinyl still available are Rubber Soul, Revolver, The Beatles and Mono Masters, a 3-LP set of singles.

Five years after the initial CD release, mono editions of each of the albums are available individually in the vinyl format, though the mono editions for CD are still available only in the box set. All of the American albums can be had on CD individually in mono paired with the original stereo mixes; this is the only other way to acquire the mono mixes on CD.

Disc listing
The thirteen-disc (fourteen on LP) collection contains the remastered mono versions of every Beatles album released in true mono. The original 1965 stereo mixes of Help! and Rubber Soul are included on the CD version as bonuses on their respective albums. (In 1986 both albums had been remixed by George Martin for their CD release in 1987.) The box contains a new two-disc compilation album titled Mono Masters, which compiles all the mono mixes of singles, B-sides and EP tracks that did not originally appear on any of the UK albums or Magical Mystery Tour.

Please Please Me (1963)
With the Beatles (1963)
A Hard Day's Night (1964)
Beatles for Sale (1964)
Help! (1965)
Rubber Soul (1965)
Revolver (1966)
Sgt. Pepper's Lonely Hearts Club Band (1967)
Magical Mystery Tour (1967)
The Beatles (1968)
Mono Masters (1962–1970)

The albums Yellow Submarine, Abbey Road and Let It Be are not included in this set, as no true mono mixes of these albums were issued. The same holds true for the songs "The Ballad of John and Yoko", "Old Brown Shoe" and the single mix of "Let It Be", which were also omitted. A mono version of the Yellow Submarine album was released in the UK, but it was simply a fold-down (two stereo channels combined into one channel) from the stereo mix, not a unique and separate mono mix. Abbey Road and Let It Be were issued in the UK in mono on reel-to-reel tape and on LP in Brazil and other countries but, again, only as fold-downs from the respective stereo versions.

The previously unavailable true mono mixes of the four new Beatles songs released on the Yellow Submarine album ("Only a Northern Song", "All Together Now", "Hey Bulldog" and "It's All Too Much"), originally intended for a separate, but ultimately scrapped mono EP which would have also included a mono mix of "Across the Universe", are included on the Mono Masters compilation. Also omitted from this set, but included in the stereo box set, is a DVD containing the mini-documentaries included with the stereo remasters of the different albums.

The Beatles (commonly referred to as The White Album) was originally released in mono and stereo in the UK and several other countries, but in the United States, it was released only in stereo. However, the mono mixes of "Don't Pass Me By" and "Helter Skelter" had been previously issued in the US in 1980 on the Capitol Records Rarities compilation album.

All CDs replicate their original album labels as first released, from the various Parlophone Records label variations, to the Capitol Records label (for Magical Mystery Tour) and the UK Apple Records side A and B labels for discs 1 and 2 respectively for The Beatles. For Mono Masters, disc 1 uses a mid-1960s Parlophone label design and disc 2 uses the unsliced Apple label design. All vinyl labels use the Apple label design.

The CD set also includes a 44-page booklet which includes an essay on the important role that the mono mixes played in the Beatles' recording career, notes on every track featured in Mono Masters, and a track-by-track listing of the recordings. The vinyl set includes a 108-page book which also includes many rare photographs of the Beatles in Abbey Road Studio, fascinating EMI archive documents and evocative articles sourced from 1960s publications.

Chart performance
The set debuted at number 40 on Billboard's Top 200 chart and the magazine reported that 12,000 copies were sold in its first week of release. In Japan, it debuted at number 10, selling over 20,000 copies in its first week on the Oricon album charts. The set was certified platinum by the Recording Industry Association of America in April 2010.

References

External links
Details of remasters reported in Chicago

Albums produced by George Martin
The Beatles compilation albums
2009 compilation albums
Capitol Records compilation albums
Apple Records compilation albums
Albums arranged by George Martin
Albums arranged by Paul McCartney
Albums conducted by George Martin
Albums conducted by Paul McCartney
Albums arranged by Mike Leander
Albums arranged by George Harrison
Albums conducted by George Harrison
Albums arranged by John Lennon
Albums conducted by John Lennon
Reissue albums
Compilation albums published posthumously